This is a disambiguation page:

 Adaptive design (medicine)
 Adaptive web design